Andrea Giaconi (born 11 April 1974 in Reggio Emilia) is an Italian hurdler.

Biography
He won the silver medal at the 2005 Mediterranean Games. He also participated at the World Championships in 1999 and 2003, the World Indoor Championships in 2004 and 2006 and the 2000 Olympic Games without reaching the final.

His personal best time is 13.35 seconds, achieved in June 2002 in Annecy. Was Italian record till May 2012, when Emanuele Abate beat it.

National titles
He has won 5 times the individual national championship.
3 wins in the 110 metres hurdles (1999, 2005, 2006)
2 wins in the 60 metres hurdles indoor (2005, 2006)

See also
Italian all-time lists - 110 metres hurdles

References

External links
 

1974 births
Living people
Italian male hurdlers
Athletes (track and field) at the 2000 Summer Olympics
Olympic athletes of Italy
World Athletics Championships athletes for Italy
Mediterranean Games silver medalists for Italy
Athletes (track and field) at the 2005 Mediterranean Games
Mediterranean Games medalists in athletics
Sportspeople from Reggio Emilia